Abraham Kiplimo (born 14 April 1989 in Suam, Kapchorwa District) is a Ugandan long-distance runner. At the 2012 Summer Olympics, he competed in the Men's 5000 metres, finishing 24th overall in Round 1, failing to qualify for the final. At the 2011 World Championships in Athletics he failed to get past the heats of the 5000 m.

Career
Kiplimo made his marathon debut at the 2013 Rotterdam Marathon, finishing eleventh in a time of 2:13:32 hours. He represented his country in the marathon at the 2013 World Championships in Athletics and placed 19th overall. He had his first marathon win at the 2014 Beppu-Oita Marathon in Japan. His victory in a time of 2:09:23 hours (a personal best of over four minutes) marked the first time he had ranked within the top ten over the distance.

At the 2014 Commonwealth Games, Kiplimo won a bronze medal for Uganda in the men's marathon, finishing behind Michael Shelley of Australia and Kenya's Stephen Kwelio Chemlany in a time of 2:12:23 hours. This was Kiplimo's maiden international medal.

References

External links
 
 

Living people
1989 births
Olympic athletes of Uganda
Ugandan male long-distance runners
Ugandan male marathon runners
Athletes (track and field) at the 2012 Summer Olympics
People from Kapchorwa District
Athletes (track and field) at the 2014 Commonwealth Games
World Athletics Championships athletes for Uganda
Commonwealth Games medallists in athletics
Commonwealth Games bronze medallists for Uganda
21st-century Ugandan people
Medallists at the 2014 Commonwealth Games